The Opel Antara is a compact crossover SUV which was marketed by Opel from 2006 to 2015. Based on the Theta platform, the Antara closely shared its underpinnings and powertrains with the Chevrolet Captiva. However, it only offered five seats instead of seven, and features a different exterior and interior design. Sales commenced in November 2006, as the indirect successor to the Isuzu-based Frontera range.

In the United Kingdom, the car was sold as the Vauxhall Antara, in Australasia the car was badged as the Holden Captiva 5/Captiva MaXX, and in the United States and Canada it had been sold as the Saturn Vue. The Antara was marketed as the GMC Terrain in the Middle East, Daewoo Winstorm MaXX in South Korea, and as the Chevrolet Captiva Sport in the Americas except Chile, where it was sold as an Opel.

Production 
The Antara was first previewed by the three door Opel Antara GTC (Gran Turismo Crossover) concept car, presented at the 2005 Frankfurt Motor Show. The Antara GTC is based on the three door Chevrolet T2X SUV. A similar three door SUV was later displayed at the 2006 New York International Auto Show as the Saturn PreVue.

The production Antara was a longer five door SUV, similar to the Chevrolet S3X and the closely related Chevrolet Captiva.

Facelift 
In November 2010, a facelift was announced. The front end was revised, and both front and rear lights were refreshed. The new Opel badge also appear on the Opel Antara, respectively. On the inside, there was a revised centre console with more storage space and materials, improved instrument graphics and interior lighting.

An electric parking brake, a hill assistance system, and a "shift up" indicator to optimise fuel economy in manual transmission versions were all now standard. Introduced with the facelift was a new, Euro 5 compliant 2.2 litre diesel engine which replaced the previous 2.0 litre, and updated version of 2.4 litre petrol.

Production ended in March 2015, with the car's indirect successor being the Grandland X, which was launched in September 2017.

Powertrain

Market

Americas 

General Motors in the United States and Canada introduced the Opel Antara as part of the Saturn division under the name "Saturn Vue" in 2007 for the 2008 model year. Saturn had earlier previewed the design at the April 2006 New York International Auto Show as the "Saturn PreVue" concept, and again in production guise at the 2007 Greater Los Angeles Auto Show, held from November to December 2006.

The Antara based model represents the second iteration of the "Vue" nameplate, with production moved to Ramos Arizpe, Mexico. The Ramos Arizpe facility also supplies the Colombian, Mexican, Brazilian and Uruguayan markets with the Antara, although it is badged "Chevrolet Captiva Sport" in these countries.
In Chile it was sold as Opel Antara from Germany and shared market with its sister Chevrolet Captiva which came from South Korea.

The Insurance Institute for Highway Safety (IIHS) awarded the model year of 2008 Vue its Top Safety Pick after receiving a good overall score in both the front and side impact tests.

Trim levels include the "XE", "XR", the sports oriented "Red Line", and the "Green Line" hybrid. Saturn fitted the Vue with the  2.4 litre Ecotec inline four.

Exterior appearance changes for the "Red Line" include 18 inch alloy wheels, and a more aggressive front bumper, tail lamps and exhaust tips.

The front wheel drive only "Green Line" petrol/electric hybrid uses the same mild BAS Hybrid system with the 2.4 litre engine as the first generation Vue. Software updates and optimisations have smoothed the operation while also improving fuel economy. Under the 2008 EPA standards, the Vue is listed at / city/highway.

Saturn dropped the "Green Line" badge for 2009, in favour of the name "Hybrid". A full hybrid model featuring GM's two-mode system was to have been introduced for the 2009 year model.

This version was to have maintained the  towing capacity of the standard 3.6 litre variant and would have utilised the 2MT70 continuously variable automatic transmission. Saturn was also expected to release a plug-in hybrid version of the two mode hybrid platform for the model year of 2010.

This was to have been the first plug in hybrid with the system offered as original equipment.

For the model year of 2010, little was changed from the previous year — the most prominent being the deletion of the "Red Line" trim and the slight gain in power output for the four cylinder engine range. Production of the 2010 model year Vue ceased in 2009, following the closing of the Saturn brand.

This decision did not affect the assembly of the "Chevrolet Captiva Sport" for Latin and South American markets. After Saturn's demise, GM planned to retail the upcoming two mode hybrid Vue as a Buick from the model year of 2011. It would have included the 8 kWh lithium-ion battery pack found in Chevrolet Volt.

GM subsequently cancelled its production plan of the Buick following negative reception, while concurrently announcing the plug in hybrid powertrain would be transferred to another vehicle during 2011.

In the end of 2011, for the model year of 2012, the Mexico built Chevrolet Captiva Sport was imported into the United States for fleet buyers. This decision was made to fill the void for compact crossovers as Chevrolet phased out the HHR. The model of 2012 was available with a 2.4 litre inline four (LS trim) or 3.0 litre V6 (LT and LTZ), with both engines mated to a six speed automatic transmission.

All wheel drive is optional on LTZ. The V6 and optional all wheel drive were dropped by July 2013.

The Captiva Sport was discontinued in the United States in August 2014, as Chevrolet directed fleet buyers to the Equinox SUV or the new City Express van instead. The Captiva Sport was also discontinued in Mexico around October 2015 after the reintroduction of the Chevrolet Equinox. However, the Ramos Arizpe facility continued to assemble it for the other Latin American markets until 2017 when it was replaced by the third generation Equinox.

Australia 

The market in Australia received the Antara as part of the range of the Holden Captiva from 2006 until October 2015. When introduced in November 2006 after being announced the previous September, the Antara based Holden was known as the "Captiva MaXX", selling alongside the cheaper Chevrolet Captiva based Holden models.

It was offered with a single powertrain, a five speed automatic equipped 3.2-litre V6. The MaXX remained on sale in Australia until 2008, although New Zealand sales continued until the end of 2009.

In a reversal of the Antara based Captiva's previous market position, Holden in December 2009 reintroduced the model as the price leading five seater "Captiva 5", while the more expensive Chevrolet based seven seat only models were rebranded "Captiva 7".

Holden fitted the Captiva 5 with the 2.4 litre petrol engine only. Front wheel drive models employed the five speed manual transmission only, with the five speed automatic variant tendered only in conjunction with all wheel drive.

Series II revisions were announced for Captiva 5 in February 2011, with sales commencing in March. The changes included the implementation of the facelift, including a new mesh grille insert with thin air intakes, chrome bezelled fog lamps, and new tail lamp lenses. The Series II Captiva 5 also gained updated powertrains, with an uprated 2.4 litre inline four petrol engine, and the  2.2 litre turbo diesel.

Six speed manual and automatic transmissions are fitted with the petrol engine, with diesel available only with the six speed automatic.

References

External links 

 

Antara
Compact sport utility vehicles
Crossover sport utility vehicles
All-wheel-drive vehicles
Front-wheel-drive vehicles
Cars introduced in 2006
2010s cars
Cars discontinued in 2015